In Writing is a 1961 Australian television play by an Australian writer living in London, Raymond Bowers, and directed by Kevin Shine.

It was first presented on the BBC in London in 1956 and was also presented on stage and radio.

Australian TV drama was relatively rare at the time.

Plot
According to the Sydney Morning Herald it was "the story of an unusual murder in London involving a husband and wife, investigated in an unorthodox manner by Detective-Inspector Hurst." James Peebles has befriended John Clostin's wife and Clostin is unhappy with that.

Cast
Leonard Teale as Detective Inspector Hurst	
Ric Hutton as John Clostin	
Anne Haddy as Mrs Clostin
James Workman as Pr Bowman
Richard Parry as James Peebles
Jack Ford as Sergeant
Carolyn Keely as waitress

Production
It was produced for British TV in 1956 with a cast including Bernard Lee and Terence Morgan.

It was Bowers' second script done for Australian TV the first being It's the Geography That Counts.

The play was also performed on Australian radio in 1961.

Reception
The Sydney Morning Herald called it an "unpretentious little suspense play which several times tripped over its own excess of ingenuity" and "suppressed far too many major facts to play fair with the audience."

References

External links

1956 British TV production at IMDb

1961 films
Australian television plays
1960s Australian television plays
Australian television films